The 2014 FIA Cross Country Rally World Cup season was the 22nd season of the FIA Cross Country Rally World Cup. Vladimir Vasilyev in Mini was the champion.

Calendar
The calendar for the 2014 season featured ten rallies. Some of the rallies are also part of FIM Cross-Country Rallies World Championship and the FIM Bajas World Cup.

The six Bajas award 30 points to the winner, whereas the other four races are worth 60 points for the winner.

Results

Drivers' Championship

 Points for final position are awarded as in the following table

Additional points are given according to group classification (T1, T2 and T3):

A coefficient 2 is applied to Cross Country rallies.

70 Drivers have been classified

References

External links
 

Cross Country Rally World Cup
Cross Country Rally World Cup